"El Próximo Viernes" (English: Next Friday) is a song by Regional Mexican singer-songwriter Espinoza Paz from his 2008 debut album El Canta Autor Del Pueblo.

Music video
The official music video for the song was released in 2008 and shows Paz singing the song while playing the guitar.

Charts

Year-end charts

Thalía version 

Mexican singer Thalía released a pop version of the song as the sixth single from her live album Primera fila. It was released on iTunes as a promotional single in 2009. Then in 2011, after four smash hit singles, it was also released as a commercial and airplay single. The song had a heavy airplay and was a popular song on the radios. The single was well received for the public. It was a best seller on iTunes and general stores.

Music video

The official music video for the song was the performance from the live concert and DVD recorded in 2009.

Certifications

References

Thalía songs
2011 singles
Spanish-language songs
2008 songs